The International Journal of Forecasting is a quarterly peer-reviewed scientific journal on forecasting. It is published by Elsevier on behalf of the International Institute of Forecasters. Its objective is to "unify the field of forecasting and to bridge the gap between theory and practice, making forecasting useful and relevant for decision and policy makers". The journal was established in 1985. According to the Journal Citation Reports, the journal has a 2021 impact factor of 7.022.

Editors-in-chief
The editors-in-chief of the journal have been:
 Pierre Pinson (2019–)
 Esther Ruiz (2019)
 Rob J. Hyndman (2005–2018)
 Jan G. de Gooijer (1998–2004)
 Robert Fildes (1988–1998)
 J. Scott Armstrong (1988–1989)
 Spyros Makridakis (1985–1987)

References

External links
 

Statistics journals
Quarterly journals
Elsevier academic journals
Publications established in 1985
English-language journals